Louis Lamothe (1822–1869) was a French academic artist born in Lyon. He is remembered today primarily as the teacher of several more renowned artists, notably Edgar Degas, Elie Delaunay, Henry Lerolle, Henri Regnault, and James Tissot.

Lamothe was a pupil of Jean Auguste Dominique Ingres and Jean-Hippolyte Flandrin.  Art historian Jean Sutherland Boggs describes him as a history painter "in a pious Christian tradition", and likens his "correct, moral, bourgeois, and even sanctimonious portraits" to those of Flandrin, whom Lamothe assisted  in the decoration of the church of St-Martin-d'Ainay in 1855.

Notes

References
Baumann, Felix; Karabelnik, Marianne, et al. 1994. Degas Portraits. London: Merrell Holberton. 
Thomson, Richard. 1988. Degas, the nudes. New York, N.Y.: Thames and Hudson. 
Getty Union List of Artist Names

1822 births
1869 deaths
19th-century French painters
French male painters
19th-century painters of historical subjects
19th-century French male artists